The Zoomar lens was the first commercially successful zoom lens, created by optical engineer Frank G. Back as an outgrowth of his research on viewfinders and variable focal length projectors for the United States military. A prototype version was used by WCBS-TV on July 21, 1947 to cover the Brooklyn Dodgers / Cincinnati Reds game. The first commercial version was used by Paramount newsreel photographers to cover the 1947 World Series.

In 1949, WAVE-TV became the first television station in the United States, to present a live telecast of the Kentucky Derby. The telecast was the first use of a Zoomar Lens in a television sports broadcast. The lens was loaned to WAVE by Back. Not long after the Derby, WAVE acquired a Zoomar lens of its own, which was frequently loaned to the other stations owned by WAVE-TV.

In 1958 Dr. Back bought the German optical firm Kilfitt from its owner Heinz Kilfitt, who retired.  Kilfitt was one of the best and most innovative German lens makers of the 1950s and 1960s. The Münich factory started to produce the first production 35mm SLR zoom, the famous 36-82/2.8 Zoomar in 1959. It was originally made in Voigtlander Bessamatic and Exakta mount. Most Kilfitt and Zoomar lenses left the factory with versatile interchangeable lens mounts. In 1986 Zoomar unfortunately left the civilian market, concentrating on US military optics.

In 1959 Voigtländer began marketing a version designed for 35mm still photography.

References

External links

Zoom Lens History

Photographic lenses by brand